The Grupo para el Desarrollo Integral de la Capital (Group for the Integral Development of Havana) is an urban planning effort in Havana, Cuba, established in 1987. According to one scholar, it was "created to develop new ways of dealing with the problems created by three decades of neglect" of the city by the state.

History
Participants have included architect Mario Coyula Cowley, among others. In 1988 the group began organizing "Talleres de Transformacion Integral del Barrio" (neighborhood transformation workshops) which devised plans for local development. The workshops involved local ward "consejos populares" (popular councils), and sometimes also advisors from Cuban government agencies or international entities.

References

Bibliography

 
 
 

Organizations based in Havana
Urban planning organizations
1987 establishments in Cuba